The women's 100 metres at the 2010 World Junior Championships in Athletics was held at the Moncton 2010 Stadium on 20 & 21 July.

Medalists

Records
Prior to the competition, the existing world junior and championship records were as follows.

No new records were established during the competition.

Results

Final
21 July
Wind: -0.7 m/s

Semifinals
21 July

Semifinal 1
Wind: +1.7 m/s

Semifinal 2
Wind: +1.6 m/s

Semifinal 3
Wind: +1.2 m/s

Heats
20 July

Heat 1
Wind: +0.3 m/s

Heat 2
Wind: +0.2 m/s

Heat 3
Wind: +0.2 m/s

Heat 4
Wind: +0.1 m/s

Heat 5
Wind: 0.0 m/s

Heat 6
Wind: +0.3 m/s

Participation
According to an unofficial count, 41 athletes from 34 countries participated in the event.

References

External links
100 metres (heats). IAAF. Retrieved on 2010-07-21.
100 metres (semifinals). IAAF. Retrieved on 2010-07-21.
100 metres (final). IAAF. Retrieved on 2010-07-21.
13th IAAF World Junior Championships Facts & Figures. IAAF. Retrieved on 2010-07-21.

100 metres
100 metres at the World Athletics U20 Championships
2010 in women's athletics